Viper is an American action-adventure television series about a special United States task force set up by the federal government to fight crime in the fictional city of Metro City, California that is perpetually under siege from one crime wave after another. The weapon used by this task force is an urban assault vehicle that masquerades as a Dodge Viper RT/10 roadster and coupe (later, the Viper GTS). The series takes place in "the near future". The primary brand of vehicles driven in the show were Chrysler or subsidiary companies. The series ran on NBC for one season in 1994 before being revived two years later for three more seasons of first-run syndication. Reruns of the series have appeared on Sci-Fi Channel and USA Network.

The Viper Defender "star car" was designed by Chrysler Corporation engineers unlike most Hollywood film/television cars that are usually customized by film picture designers. The exterior design of the car was produced by Chrysler stylist Steve Ferrerio.

NBC run
The original series began filming in Los Angeles Area in early 1993 and was planned to debut on CBS in Fall 1993. However, it was first delayed when Stephen J. Cannell also named his new TV show Viper. After a lawsuit by Chrysler Corporation, Cannell renamed his show Cobra. The premiere of Viper was delayed further when CBS deemed the series to be too violent and decided to bury it. However, due to Chrysler's backing, production of the series proceeded, and was picked up by NBC.

The series originally aired on NBC during the 1993–1994 season, debuting on January 2, 1994 with a two-hour pilot movie, as a mid-season replacement for Against the Grain in NBC's Friday Night 8PM slot. After falling ratings, the series was canceled in April 1994.

The music for the pilot and opening theme for season 1 was composed by Eddie Jobson. Jay Ferguson took over music composition for the rest of the seasons. He composed a remixed theme of the original season-1 opening and the brand new season-4 opening theme.

The Dodge Viper RT/10 Roadsters used in seasons 1–3 were actually not production models. Instead, Chrysler supplied various leftover engineering mules and prototypes of the Viper (still visually the same). Many other cars in season 1 were leftover prototypes, as well. For example, in the pilot movie, the Eagle Premier sedans with yellow vinyl stripes were drivetrain engineering mules for the LH cars (Dodge Intrepid/Chrysler Concorde).

The special effect "hex snakeskin" transformation for the pilot and the first season was done by Metrolight Studios. Tim Claycomb and Tim Eilers took over the transformation sequence after the first season. Sources indicate that it cost $50,000 for each transformation scene in the NBC season.

First-run syndication version

After NBC canceled the series, production company Paramount Television decided to rework Viper for first-run syndication. With the company's syndication unit as distributor, Viper began airing on weekends in September 1996. The only actor to return for season 2 was Joe Nipote in his role as Frankie "X" Waters, and he would remain until the end of the series. James McCaffrey, who played Joe Astor, the Viper's driver in season 1, returned in season 4. Heather Medway, who played Det. Cameron Westlake, was the only new cast member from the show's revival to stay on the entire three syndicated seasons (from 1996 to 1999).

Season 2 was filmed predominantly in Calgary, Alberta. The series was then moved for filming in Vancouver, British Columbia, during seasons 3 and 4. The Cobalt Blue Metallic color on the Viper GTS in season 4 was not an optional color for the production Viper GTS; it was specifically for the show only.

Viper came to an end in May 1999.

Overview

Season 1 (1994)
Metro City was under siege from the crime wave that was begun by "the Outfit", a crime group led in the pilot by a man known only as Mr. Townsend (played by William Russ), and later led by Lane Cassidy (played by Richard Burgi). The Metro City Police Department, or MetroPol, was unable to get a handle on the situation. This led to the creation of the Viper Project, a special top-secret task force created by the federal government to fight the wave of violence sweeping Metro City.

This task force used a modified 1994 Flame Red Dodge Viper RT/10 Roadster sports car that could, at the flip of a secret switch, transform from a muscle car into an armored machine known as "Defender". The "Defender" was an invention of technological specialist Julian Wilkes (played by Dorian Harewood), who was paralyzed during a shootout between police and criminals. The project was delayed by numerous setbacks, mainly because regular drivers were unable to handle this deadly machine. A precision driver was needed for this car.

Michael Payton (played by James McCaffrey), a top driver for the Outfit, was leading his team from their latest heist when he got caught in an accident and was injured. Captured, Payton's memory was erased and he was reborn as Joe Astor, an officer for Metropol. Astor proves to be the only one capable of handling the Defender.

Since the Viper Project successfully made a dent in the profits made by the Outfit, they kidnap Astor and demand that he steal the Defender. He agrees to do so, but changes his mind. In retaliation, the Outfit murders his girlfriend, Elizabeth Houston. As for the Viper Project itself, the Outfit bribes Councilman Strand (played by Jon Polito), the man who approved the Viper Project and orchestrated the erasure of Payton's memory, to help them discredit the project, leading to its cancellation. However, Astor and Wilkes, with the help of mechanic Franklin Waters (played by Joe Nipote), steal the Viper and gain access to Payton's bank account, using both in a private war against crime. Astor runs the operation for several months before he is sent to Europe to handle deep cover operations for the U.S. government, leading to the end of the Viper Team's war on crime.

Season 2 (1996–1997)
Shortly after Astor's departure, Metro City was hit by a second crime wave, this time in the form of a team of renegade ex-commandos led by Col. Hanson Dekker (played by Tim Thomerson), a former U.S. Army Special Forces officer, who served combat tours in Iraq, Bosnia, and Cuba. Against this backdrop, Thomas Cole (played by Jeff Kaake), a CIA agent with evasive driving experience, was selected to head a new Viper Team. He was delivering the new Viper to Metro City when he was pulled over for speeding by two MetroPol officers, Cameron Westlake (played by Heather Medway) and her partner, an officer named Carpenter (played by Roger R. Cross). During this traffic stop, Dekker and his commandos hit the Metro City Bank.

Upon hearing of the bank heist on their radio, Carpenter and Westlake left Cole behind to join their fellow officers at the bank to confront Dekker and his commandos. Officer Carpenter saved Westlake's life by knocking her to the ground when the International Transtar 4300 tractor Dekker was driving smashed through the Metropol roadblock, only to die when he was shot by Dekker's second-in-command, Lee Cyrus (played by Dean Wray). Because of the bank heist, the Viper Project was reborn, with a Metropol liaison to ride shotgun. For this assignment, Westlake's superior, Capt. Harold Benning (played by Mike Genovese), promoted her to detective and sent her to the meeting place, where she found herself meeting Thomas Cole, the very man Carpenter and she pulled over for speeding. She also met Waters, the original mechanic from the first Viper Project, and Allie Farrow (played by Dawn Stern), Viper's systems specialist.

Despite a systems glitch and the kidnapping of Waters by Dekker and his men, the Viper Team defeated them and rescued Waters. Dekker was killed when his Transtar 4300 was blown up by the team to keep it from crashing into Metro Hospital.

After this victory, the Viper Team carried on its crusade against evil, overcoming such obstacles as interference by Special Agent Sherman Catlett (played by J. Downing), a by-the-book bureaucrat from the FBI, to the team being discredited again, this time by Lee Cyrus, the man who murdered Westlake's partner, Officer Carpenter.

Cyrus' scheme to discredit the team involved a replica of the Viper in the Defender configuration, which his men and he used to commit vicious crimes, including a murder. This led Cole's superior, the Administrator (played by Bruce A. Young), to shut down the team. In defiance of orders to stand down, the team cleared their name and Westlake avenged Carpenter's death.

Season 3 (1997–1998)
After serving as the team's systems specialist for several months, Allie Farrow was reassigned to another post, which left Waters to take care of the Defender's systems and mechanical needs by himself. During this period, the team had to contend with new enemies, including Lena Weisinger (played by Stephanie Niznik), a former Stasi agent turned freelance mercenary, who had a personal vendetta against Westlake for killing her lover, Emil Rurik (played by Mike Dopud), during a shootout.

However, after years of successful operation, the team suffered a tragic loss ... not of one of their people, but the car. A notorious criminal named Giles Seaton (played by Peter Wingfield) concocted a plot to steal the Defender by using a criminal named Terry Hawkes (Jeff Kaake in a dual role), who was turned into a Thomas Cole look-alike with plastic surgery. As Cole, Hawkes successfully penetrated the team's headquarters, and despite being exposed by the real Cole, made off with the Viper. To prevent Hawkes from escaping, the team blew up the Viper, keeping its secrets from falling into enemy hands.

Season 4 (1998–1999)
In the aftermath of the Viper's destruction, Cole was permanently reassigned to undercover work on other fronts. With the team gone, Metro City was again gripped by an enormous crime wave, forcing the feds to restart the Viper Team a third time. This time, the car they used was a 1996 Cobalt Blue Metallic Dodge Viper GTS Coupe, which, due to Wilkes, had the equipment of the original Defender, along with some new equipment, most notably the hovercraft mode. Since Cole had been reassigned, Joe Astor, the original driver, was called back to service. However, Astor was haunted by his old Payton identity once more.

Cast and characters
 James McCaffrey as Michael Payton / Joe Astor (seasons 1,4)
 Joe Nipote as Frankie Xavier Waters
 Dorian Harewood as Julian Wilkes (seasons 1,4)
 Jeff Kaake as Thomas Cole / as Terry Hawkes (seasons 2–3)
 Heather Medway as Cameron Westlake (seasons 2-4)
 J. Downing as Agent Sherman Catlett
 Dawn Stern as Allie Farrow (season 2)

Episodes

Season 1 (1994)

Season 2 (1996–97)

Season 3 (1997–98)

Season 4 (1998–99)

Home media
The first season of Viper was released by Kinowelt on German-language DVD in Europe in early 2011. The pilot movie and all 12 episodes are included in the Region 2 PAL Release. They subsequently released the remaining syndicated seasons thereafter.

In 2015, Visual Entertainment (VEI) picked up the DVD rights for The Sentinel, which was produced for UPN by the same production team that was responsible for Viper. TVShowsOnDVD announced on November 11, 2015 that VEI listed Viper on their website's coming soon section. The website stated "complete collection" meaning the NBC and syndicated seasons will launch simultaneously. In March 2017, in a response to a Facebook post about the series' DVD release, VEI announced that it is "coming this summer". In early-November 2017,  VEI released a teaser of its release on their YouTube channel. On November 20, 2017, 18 years after the show's finale aired, VEI announced that Viper's English-language DVD release was available for pre-order, along with releasing a high-resolution image of the DVD Box set which confirmed that all 4 seasons (including the 2 hour pilot) will be included. Shipping officially started on December 8, 2017

References

External links
 
 

1990s American science fiction television series
1994 American television series debuts
1999 American television series endings
English-language television shows
Fictional cars
First-run syndicated television programs in the United States
NBC original programming
Television series by CBS Studios
Television shows filmed in Vancouver
Television shows set in California
American television series revived after cancellation
Fiction about memory erasure and alteration
Television shows set in Calgary